Špičnik is a dispersed settlement in the western Slovene Hills in the Municipality of Kungota in northeastern Slovenia, next to the border with Austria.

References

External links
Špičnik on Geopedia

Populated places in the Municipality of Kungota